Felice Di Gaetano (born 14 February 1898, date of death unknown) was an Italian racing cyclist. He rode in the 1924 Tour de France.

References

1898 births
Year of death missing
Italian male cyclists